The high sheriff is the oldest secular office under the Crown.  Formerly the high sheriff was the principal law enforcement officer in the county but over the centuries most of the responsibilities associated with the post have been transferred elsewhere or are now defunct, so that its functions are now largely ceremonial.  The high sheriff changes every April.

The position of High Sheriff of Cumbria has existed since the creation of the non-metropolitan and ceremonial county of Cumbria in 1974 which saw the abolition of the former shrievalties of Cumberland and Westmorland.  As well as Cumberland and Westmorland Cumbria also includes former parts of Lancashire and the West Riding of Yorkshire.

The non-metropolitan county of Cumbria is to be abolished in April 2023 and replaced with two unitary authorities to be known as Cumberland and Westmorland and Furness. The two new unitary authorities will continue to constitute a ceremonial county named "Cumbria" for the purpose of lieutenancy and shrievalties, being presided over by a Lord Lieutenant of Cumbria and a High Sheriff of Cumbria.

List of high sheriffs

1974: George Nigel Fancourt Wingate, O.B.E., of Bridge End House, Cockermouth
1975: Michael Charles Stanley, M.B.E., of Halecat, Witherslack, Grange-over-Sands
1976: Joseph Hugh Harris, of Brackenburgh, Calthwaite, Penrith
1977: Edward Hubert Fleming-Smith, T.D., of Hawksdale Hall, Dalston, Carlisle
1978: Richard Hugh Cavendish, of Holker Hall
1979: Stafford Vaughan Stepney Howard, of Greystoke Castle, Penrith
1980: Charles Henry Bagot, of Levens Hall
1981: Timothy Ross Fetherstonhaugh, of The College, Kirkoswald, Penrith
1982: William John Montague Chaplin of Finsthwaite House, Ulverston
1983: Peter Eric Fyers Crewdson of Summerhow, Kendal
1984: Edward Peter Ecroyd, of Low House, Armathwaite, Carlisle
1985: Major Antony James Robinson Harrison, of Wreay Hall, Wreay, Carlisle
1986: Major Nigel James Clarkson Webb, of Buckstone House, Burton-in-Kendal, via Carnforth, Lancs.
1987: William Victor Gubbins, Esq., of Eden Lacy, Lazonby, Penrith
1988: Roger Brockbank, of Common Head, Staveley, Kendal
1989: Major Timothy Richard Riley, of Burbank House, Blencowe, Penrith
1990: Thomas Peter Naylor, of The Clock House, Far Sawrey, Ambleside
1991: Ian Cufaude Carr, of Brown Hill, Walton, Brampton
1992: Myles Christopher Ross Sandys, of Graythwaite Hall, Ulverston
1993: Mrs. Margaret Washington
1994: Frederick John Richard Boddy, of Curwen Woods, Burton
1995: Hugh William Lawson, of Croplands, Heads Nook, Carlisle
1996: Henry Charles Fraser Bowring, of Whelprigg House, Barbon
1997: John Henry Fryer-Spedding, OBE, Mirehouse, Keswick
1998: Simon Philip Pease, Underley Grange, Kirkby Lonsdale, Carnforth
1999: Arthur Ian Bullough, of Friars Garth, Walton, Brampton
2000: The Lady Hothfield, Drybeck Hall, Appleby
2001: Robert Bryce Hasell-McCosh of Dalemain, Pooley Bridge, Penrith
2002: David William Trimble, of Deepdale, Dalston, Carlisle
2003: Antony Richard Leeming of Skirsgill Park, Penrith
2004: Frederick Charles Theodore Markham, Morland House, Morland, Penrith
2005: Dr Adam Charles Illingworth Naylor
2006: Robert Lawie Frederick Burgess
2007: Claire Theresa Hensman
2008: Graham William Lamont
2009: Elizabeth Honor Susan Thornely
2010: James Ronald Carr of Warwick-on-Eden
2011: Mrs Iona A Frost-Pennington of Ravenglass
2012: Mrs Juliet Deirdre Jean Westoll, M.B.E. of Longtown.
2013: Mrs Diana Ruth Matthews of Windermere.
2014: Martyn Peter Telford Hart of Bankhead, Newby East, Carlisle.
2015: Samuel Miles Alan Rayner of Murley Hill, Oxenholme Road, Kendal.
2016: The Rev'd (Group Captain) (Thomas) Richard Lee (RAF rtd) of Egremont
2017: Alistair George Milne Wannop of Linstock, Carlisle.
2018: Simon Frederick Michael Berry of Windermere.
2019: Marcia Elaine Reid Fotheringham, JP of Brampton.
2020: Mrs Julie Elizabeth Barton of Ulverston.
2021: David George Beeby of Cockermouth
2022: Alan McViety
2023: Mrs Samantha Scott

References

 
Sheriff
Cumbria
High Sheriffs of Cumbria